The 1995 English cricket season was the 96th in which the County Championship had been an official competition. There was a continued dominance of the domestic scene by Warwickshire after they won the Britannic Assurance County Championship and the NatWest Trophy. 
The West Indies toured England to compete in a test series which was drawn 2-2.

Honours
County Championship - Warwickshire CCC
NatWest Trophy - Warwickshire CCC
Sunday League - Kent CCC
Benson & Hedges Cup - Lancashire CCC
Minor Counties Championship - Devon
MCCA Knockout Trophy - Cambridgeshire
Second XI Championship - Hampshire II 
Wisden - Dominic Cork, Aravinda de Silva, Angus Fraser, Anil Kumble, Dermot Reeve

Test series

West Indies tour

England played against West Indies and drew 2–2.

County Championship

NatWest Trophy

Benson & Hedges Cup

Sunday League

Leading batsmen

Leading bowlers

References

External links
 CricketArchive – season and tournament itineraries

Annual reviews
 Playfair Cricket Annual 1996
 Wisden Cricketers' Almanack 1996

English cricket seasons in the 20th century
English Cricket Season, 1995
Cricket season